Leon D. Case (January 15, 1877 – July 6, 1939) was a politician in Michigan.

Biography

Career
Case was twice a member of the Michigan Senate. First serving from 1913 to 1914, and, after unsuccessfully running in 1928, serving again from 1933 to 1936. In 1936, he was a candidate for the Democratic nomination for Lieutenant Governor of Michigan to run on the gubernatorial ticket with Frank Murphy, losing to Leo J. Nowicki. Later, he was Michigan Secretary of State from 1937 to 1938.

Case died in Milwaukee at the age of 62.

References

People from Ellsworth, Wisconsin
Secretaries of State of Michigan
Democratic Party Michigan state senators
1877 births
1939 deaths
20th-century American politicians